The Queen's Award for Enterprise: Innovation (Technology) (2007) was awarded on 21 April 2007, by Queen Elizabeth II.

Recipients
The following organisations were awarded this year.

 Air Products PLC, Packaged Gases Group of Basingstoke, Hampshire for Integra-Maxx gases and cylinders for welding and cutting.
 Aquapac International Limited of London SE24 for design, manufacture and marketing of waterproof protective cases.
 Autoflame Engineering Ltd of London SE6 for the Mk6 Evolution MM Combustion Management System.
 BMP Europe Ltd of Altham, Accrington, for paper transport rollers for high speed digital printers.
 Baxi Heating UK Ltd (t/a Andrews Water Heaters) of Wednesbury, West Midlands for 'MAXXflo' direct fired high-efficiency condensing stainless steel storage water heater.
 The Binding Site Ltd of Birmingham, for novel blood test for bone marrow cancer.
 West Midlands CSR PLC of Cambridge, BlueCore – system-on-chip solutions for bluetooth applications.
 Care Monitoring 2000 Ltd of Sutton Coldfield, West Midlands for CallConfirmLive!, an IT based monitoring and management service for home care.
 Charity Financial Services of West Malling, Kent for charitable/financial services to the voluntary sector focusing on small and medium-sized charities.
 De La Rue Currency of Basingstoke, Hampshire for StarChrome wide windowed optically variable banknote security thread.
 EA Technology Limited of Capenhurst, Chester for the UltraTEV Detector Partial for discharge instrument for monitoring high voltage equipment.
 Enterprise Control Systems Ltd of Towcester, Encrypted for COFDM digital video transmission systems.
 FlavorActiV Limited of Chinnor, Oxfordshire for Taster Validation for scheme to assess and track beer tasters' competencies within breweries.
 Fortress Interlocks Limited of Wolverhampton, West Midlands for design of 'mGard', a mechanical safety interlocking product.
 Freeman Technology Ltd of Malvern, Worcestershire for fT4 powder rheometer for measuring the flow properties of powders.
 James Halstead plc of Radcliffe, Manchester for commercial safety flooring, branded 'Polysafe'.
 Hickman Industries Ltd of Wolverhampton, for timber system building products.
 West Midlands i-level Ltd of London SW1 for i-level – changing from a media agency to a commercial agency.
 International Paint Ltd (Marine Division) of Gateshead, Tyne and Wear for 'Intersleek 700' fouling control coating for use on hulls and propellers of scheduled ships.
 K2 Medical Systems of Plymouth, Devon for products for improving maternity care.
 Medi Travelcover Ltd (t/a InsureCancer) of Farnham, Surrey for pioneering insurance underwriting innovation for those affected by cancer.
 Molecular Profiles Ltd of Nottingham for contract analysis and research services to pharmaceutical and biomedical companies.
 Motorola Point to Point Fixed Wireless Solutions Group of Ashburton, Devon for wireless point to point transmission equipment delivering broadband.
 IP OPRO Ltd of Hatfield, Hertfordshire for custom fitted mouthguards allowing for future growth patterns and orthodontics.
 Optical Metrology Services Limited of Bishop's Stortford, Hertfordshire for Pipe Checker- for accurate laser dimensional measurement of oil, gas and water pipes.
 Oxford Instruments Nanoanalysis of High Wycombe, Buckinghamshire for 'INCADryCool' radical innovation in cooling technology for high performance x-ray detectors.
 PCME Ltd of St Ives, Cambridgeshire for innovation in the design and distribution of particle emission instrumentation.
 QRG Limited (t/a Quantum Research Group) of Southampton, Hampshire for electronic touch sensor chips and technology licensing for control surfaces of consumer electronic products.
 Renishaw plc of Wotton-under-Edge, RMP60 and for rMI spindle probe system.
 Rockfield Software Limited of Swansea, Wales for elfen-FEM/DEM computational system for simulation of multi-fracturing solids.
 Rofin-Sinar UK Ltd of Hull, SCx60 sealed diffusion cooled RF excited for cO2 laser.
 Shackerley (Holdings) Group Limited of Chorley, Lancashire for sureclad aluminium sub-structure for fixing ceramic granite slabs.
 Snell & Wilcox Ltd of Havant, Hampshire Kahuna Multiformat for sD/HD production switcher.
 Solagen Limited of Thornbury, Bristol for solar powered highway safety products.
 Tacktick Ltd of Emsworth, for Hampshire 'Micronet' wireless marine electronics.
 Taylor Bloxham Limited of Leicester, recently entered into administration, for paint colour cards using the lithographic printing process.
 Title Research Group Ltd (now known as findmypast) of London EC1 for provision of public internet access to official genealogy records.
 UPM Machinery Sales Ltd of Langley, Slough, for removal of moisture from hygroscopic materials.
 Ultra Electronics of Weymouth, Dorset for the Alto family of low cost colour ID card printers for manufacturing and card systems, portrait identity card and badge printing.
 School of Pharmacy, The University of Nottingham of Nottingham for pharmaceutical applications of nanotechnology.

References

Queen's Award for Enterprise: Innovation (Technology)
2007 in the United Kingdom